Coleophora afghana is a moth of the family Coleophoridae that can be found in Afghanistan, Turkmenistan and Uzbekistan.

The larvae feed on Acanthophyllum elatius and other Caryophyllaceae species. They create a silky and straight case. There seven longitudinal, coarse, convex stripes on the surface to which isolated sand particles and other matter are attached. The valve is three-sided and very large. Larvae can be found in June and (after diapause) again in April.

References

External links

afghana
Moths of Asia
Moths described in 1967